Březí is a municipality and village in Žďár nad Sázavou District in the Vysočina Region of the Czech Republic. It has about 200 inhabitants.

Administrative parts
The hamlet of Ondrušky is an administrative part of Březí.

References

Villages in Žďár nad Sázavou District